= Yuri Lukin =

Russian ice hockey general manager

Yuri Lukin (born April 23, 1962, in Barnaul) is the general manager of Lokomotiv Yaroslavl, a Russian professional ice hockey team playing in the Kontinental Hockey League (KHL).
